"Yayo" is a song recorded by Greek singer Eleni Foureira. The electropop and R&B song was written by the aforementioned artist together with Andy Nicolas, Claydee and Kareem Kalokoh. An accompanying music video was shot in the United States and officially premiered onto the official YouTube channel of the singer's label Panik Records on 3 March 2020, where it has since accumulated more than 6.5 million views.

Composition and music video 

"Yayo" has a running time of two minutes and forty eight seconds, and was written by Foureira herself together with Andy Nicolas, Claydee and Kareem Kalokoh. Its production was handled by Foureira and Claydee while being mastered and mixed by Sweetspot Production. An accompanying music video for "Yayo" was premiered onto the official YouTube channel of Foureira's music label Panik Records on 3 March 2020, where it has since amassed more than 6.5 million views.

Personnel 

Credits adapted from Tidal and YouTube.

 Eleni Foureira – composing, performing, producing, songwriting, vocals
 Klejdi Llupa – composing, producing, songwriting
 Andy Nicolas – songwriting
 Kareem Kalokoh – songwriting, vocals
 Alex Leon – producing
 Marios Psimopoulos – producing
 Yannis Dimolitsas – video directing
 Alexis Kanakis – photo directing
 Manthos Sardis – colouring
 George Damaskinos – video production

Charts

Track listing 

Digital download
"Yayo" – 2:48

Release history

References 

2020 singles
2020 songs
Eleni Foureira songs
English-language Greek songs
Songs written by Andy Nicolas
Songs written by Claydee
Song recordings produced by Claydee